Faye Mata (born September 2) is an American voice actress best known for her roles as Aqua in KonoSuba, Astolfo/Rider of Black in Fate/Apocrypha, Petra Macneary in Fire Emblem: Three Houses, Yukie Shikako in Godzilla Singular Point, and Kagami Tsurugi in Miraculous: Tales of Ladybug & Cat Noir.

Gaming career 
In addition to her voice acting career, Mata has been heavily involved in various game tournaments. She particularly participated in Pokkén Tournament and Super Smash Bros. Brawl tournaments, achieving substantial notoriety in gaming circles.

While she no longer continues to actively participate in tournaments, she continues to do charity streams via Twitch where she typically plays Super Smash Bros. Ultimate, and is also signed with the esports team Panda. She has also hosted video game tournaments for charity. The most recent of these was for Voices for a Change, where money was raised for The Bail Project.

Philanthropy and charity 
Mata has contributed to the Black Girls Code, Girls Who Code, and Tyrone Gayle Scholars Program. She is vocal in supporting programs or charities that represent minority youths.  Regarding Girls Who Code, Mata described her specific passion for the program:“Essentially, that's about introducing programs/options to them that were not normally obvious or available to us growing up, naturally inspiring them to pursue those paths if they find passion through them. e.g. A female coder is rare. Girls Who Code funds free after school programs that give girls a place to not feel pressured by typical barriers and learn about coding, and maybe one day after participating in these clubs, they'll go to college and become engineers in the future, because that's what they always wanted to do, rather than trying to introduce/force change of grown adults. etc.”

Filmography 
Note that all years listed are for North American publication date.

Voice acting

In Anime

In Animation

In Film

In Games

References

External links 
 
 
 
 

Living people
American actresses of Filipino descent
American people of Japanese descent
American people of Filipino descent
American video game actresses
American voice actresses
21st-century American actresses
Year of birth missing (living people)